Titiwangsa station is a rapid transit interchange station in Kuala Lumpur, Malaysia. The station is served by the LRT Ampang and Sri Petaling Lines, the KL Monorail Line and the MRT Putrajaya Line. The station allows seamless physical and fare integration between the four train lines.

Situated on Jalan Tun Razak (English: Tun Razak Road, formerly Circular Road) in the subdistrict of Titiwangsa, the station is also located beside the Gombak River and an adjoining bus station known as Titiwangsa Sentral.

The station is planned to be an integration station with the Circle Line of the KVMRT project.

History
First opened in 1998 as part of the former STAR LRT line's second phase of development, the station was intended to connect Titiwangsa to other parts of the city and surrounding areas. Under Phase 2 of the STAR line, a 15 km track with 11 stations was built to serve the northern and southern areas of Kuala Lumpur to cater for the Commonwealth Village and the National Sports Complex in Bukit Jalil, during the 1998 Commonwealth Games in Kuala Lumpur. At that time, Titiwangsa station was named as "Tun Razak" station.

LRT station
The Titiwangsa LRT station is a light rapid transit (LRT) station along the common route of the Ampang Line and Sri Petaling Line for trains travelling south towards Ampang or Putra Heights, or north towards Sentul Timur. Opened in 1998 as part of the former STAR LRT line's second phase of development, the station was intended to connect Titiwangsa to other parts of the city and surrounding areas. The station, like all stations along the northern stretch of the LRT line, is elevated, with platforms located on the top floor and ticketing facilities located on the mid-level concourse.

Monorail station
The Monorail station is a later addition in the area that is intended to connect the LRT station with the KL Monorail. The station was constructed over Jalan Tun Razak and was completed in 2003, serving as the northern terminus of KL Monorail, with a buffer stop directly after the station. Like the LRT station, the monorail station sports somewhat similar level designs. The station was constructed with a Spanish solution layout, similar to the KL Sentral Monorail station. The station is one of two KL Monorail stations that is designated as an interchange with the Ampang and Sri Petaling Lines, the other being the Hang Tuah station.

MRT station 
The underground MRT station is the latest addition to the integrated station, serving the Putrajaya Line which opened on 16 March 2023. Titiwangsa is one of the Putrajaya Line's 3 interchanges with the Ampang/Sri Petaling Line, the other two being Chan Sow Lin and Sungai Besi, and the only one with KL Monorail.

An elevated station has also been planned for the MRT3 Circle Line in the future, making it as the next metro hub in the city with 5 integrated transit lines.

Integrated LRT and Monorail station 
Seamless transfer and fare integration was achieved on 1 March 2012 when the "paid-area" or restricted areas of both the LRT and monorail stations, which previously operated as two separate stations, were linked up with a footbridge, allowing passengers to transfer without needing to buy new tokens for the first time since the monorail became operational in 2003.

Details

Station layout

Exits and entrances

Titiwangsa interchange as a bus hub

The Titiwangsa station is located close to a bus hub, also known as the Pekeliling Bus Station, just north beside the Gombak River and simply consisting of several rows of shelters. The station serves multiple local bus services, primarily by Rapid Bus and Go KL City Bus. There are intercity bus services from here to main townships in West Pahang including Genting Highlands, Bentong, Raub, Kuala Lipis, Cameron Highlands, Jerantut, Temerloh and Triang.

Around the station
 Kuala Lumpur Hospital
 Titiwangsa Lake Park

Gallery

References

Ampang Line
Kuala Lumpur Monorail stations
Bus stations in Kuala Lumpur
Railway stations opened in 1998